Charles Harold Dodd  (1884–1973) was a Welsh New Testament scholar and influential Protestant theologian. He is known for promoting "realized eschatology", the belief that Jesus' references to the kingdom of God meant a present reality rather than a future apocalypse. He was influenced by Martin Heidegger and Rudolf Otto.

Life
Dodd was born on 7 April 1884 in the Welsh town of Wrexham, Denbighshire. He was brother of the historian A. H. Dodd. He studied classics at University College, Oxford, from 1902. After graduating in 1906 he spent a year in Berlin, where he studied under the influential Adolf von Harnack.

He studied for the ministry at Mansfield College, Oxford, and was ordained in 1912. He was a Congregationalist minister for three years in Warwick, before going into academia. From 1915 he was Yates Lecturer in New Testament at Oxford. He became Rylands Professor of Biblical Criticism and Exegesis at the Victoria University of Manchester in 1930. He was Norris–Hulse Professor of Divinity at the University of Cambridge from 1935, becoming emeritus in 1949. His students from Cambridge include David Daube and W. D. Davies. The three together, each through his own work, ushered in changes in New Testament studies that led to the New Perspective on Paul and the scholarship of Davies's student, E. P. Sanders.

He directed the work of the New English Bible translators, from 1950.

He was elected a fellow of the British Academy in 1946. He was appointed to the Order of the Companions of Honour in 1961.

Dodd died on 21 September 1973 in Goring-on-Thames, Oxfordshire, England. His daughter Rachel married the Old Testament scholar Eric William Heaton in 1951.

Works

Books
 
 
 
 
 
 
 
 
 
 
 
 
 
 
 
 
 
 
 
 
 
 
 
 
 
 
  - fiction
  - called Triptych on spine

Journal articles

References

Footnotes

Bibliography

Further reading

External links
 
Biography (National Library of Wales)
Radical Faith
Preaching and Teaching in the Early Church Chapter 1 of Gospel and Law: The Relation of Faith and Ethics in Early Christianity (1951)

1884 births
1973 deaths
20th-century Christian biblical scholars
Norris–Hulse Professors of Divinity
Academics of the Victoria University of Manchester
Alumni of University College, Oxford
British theologians
Members of the Order of the Companions of Honour
New Testament scholars
People from Wrexham
Welsh biblical scholars